Lone Star State of Mind is a 2002 American teen comedy film directed by David Semel.

Plot
Earl is an auto mechanic who lives with his mother, step-father and step-sister Baby to whom he is engaged. Baby is intent on leaving Texas for Los Angeles to be an actress. When Baby's misfit cousin Junior and his recently released ex-con friend Tinker rob a pizza delivery boy and end up with $20,000 of drug money, Baby forces Earl to look after Junior and make things right. Earl must decide between giving up his and Baby's Los Angeles money or saving Junior's limbs from a drug dealer.

Cast
 Joshua Jackson as Jesus "Earl" Crest
 Jaime King as Baby
 Matthew Davis as Jimbo
 Ryan Hurst as Tinker
 John Mellencamp as Wayne
 DJ Qualls as Junior
 Sam McMurray as Mr. Smith
 Lee Thompson Young as Chris Comer
 Thomas Haden Church as Killer
 Julian Dulce Vida as Vasquez
 Elizabeth Barondes as Smyrna
 Rodger Boyce as Sheriff Andy

Reception

References

External links